Helen Kapuailohia Desha Beamer (September 8, 1882 – September 25, 1952) was a musician, composer of songs in the Hawaiian language, hula dancer and coloratura soprano of Hawaiian ancestry.  Her descendants have also become accomplished artists in the U.S. state of Hawaii. In 1928, her duet of "Ke Kali Nei Au" with Sam Kapu Sr. on Columbia Records was the first commercial recording of the Charles E. King composition. She was inducted into the Hawaiian Music Hall of Fame in 1995.

Early life
Helen Kapuailohia Desha was born on September 8, 1882, in Honolulu, on the island of Oahu, in the Kingdom of Hawaii. Her parents were George Langhern Desha and Isabella Hale'ala Miller. Her mother and grandmother, Kapuailohiawahine Kanuha Miller, taught hula in secret when the dance was banned. Her grandmother was a notable hakumele, Hawaiian for composer of music. Helen was a graduate of Kamehameha School for Girls, where the school's music director noted her talent as a pianist and as a song composer. Kamehameha Schools was established by the estate of Bernice Pauahi Bishop to provide education for children of Hawaiian ancestry.

She was also the organist at Haili Church in Hilo.

Professional career
She had a coloratura soprano range and was a recording artist for Columbia Records. In 1928, she and artist Sam Kapu Sr. made the first commercial recording of the "Hawaiian Wedding Song," which had been written by composer Charles E. King as "Ke Kali Nei Au". She was the composer of numerous songs in the Hawaiian language that are still being recorded by contemporary Hawaiian artists.

Personal life and legacy
Helen Desha married Peter Carl Beamer of Hilo. The couple had five children. She was the matriarch of a musical dynasty that includes her grandson, falsetto singer Mahi Beamer, who was inducted into the Hawaiian Music Hall of Fame in 2006; granddaughter Winona (Nona) Beamer; and Nona Beamer's two sons, Keola and Kapono. She died in 1952 and is buried at Homelani Memorial Park in Hilo.

In 1995, she was inducted into the Hawaiian Music Hall of Fame.

Compositions (partial list)
Source:  allmusic

"Halehuki"
"He Makana"
"Ka'ahumanu"
"Kawohikukapulani"

"Ke Ali'i Hulu Mamo"
"Keawaiki"
"Ke Ha'a la Puna"
"Kimo Hula"

"Kinue"
"Lei O Ha'ena"
"Mahai'ula"
"Moanike' ala"

"Pua Malihini"
"Pupu Hinuhinu"
"Pu'uanahulu"
"Pu'uwa'awa'a (Pihanakalani)"

Family tree

References

1882 births
1952 deaths
Native Hawaiian musicians
People from Hilo, Hawaii
People from Oahu
Hawaiian Kingdom people
People of the Republic of Hawaii
People of the Territory of Hawaii
American sopranos
Hawaiian songwriters
20th-century American singers
20th-century American women singers